Indychy is a rural locality (a selo) in Staromelovatskoye Rural Settlement, Petropavlovsky District, Voronezh Oblast, Russia. The population was 539 as of 2010. There are 7 streets.

Geography 
Indychy is located 20 km north of Petropavlovka (the district's administrative centre) by road. Peski is the nearest rural locality.

References 

Rural localities in Petropavlovsky District, Voronezh Oblast